Pediastrum duplex is a species of fresh water green algae in the genus Pediastrum.

They form nonmotile coenobia (colonies) with a fixed number of cells. These coenobia are flat and have a circular shape. The cell bodies are polygonal, are granulated and have horn-like projections. They reproduce these autocolonies asexually. The colonies usually contain 8 to 32 cells, with examples of 4, 64 or 128 occurring rarely.

Infraspecies
Pediastrum duplex brachylobum
Pediastrum duplex clathratum
Pediastrum duplex cohaerens
Pediastrum duplex duplex
Pediastrum duplex f. denticulatum  Isabella & R.J. Patel
Pediastrum duplex gracillimum
Pediastrum duplex regulosum
Pediastrum duplex reticulatum
Pediastrum duplex rotundatum
Pediastrum duplex var. asperum
Pediastrum duplex var. clathratum (A. Braun) Lagerheim, 1882
Pediastrum duplex var. convexum  W. Krieger
Pediastrum duplex var. cornutum
Pediastrum duplex var. gracillimum  W. West & G.S. West
Pediastrum duplex var. irregulare  G.R. Hegde & K. Somanna
Pediastrum duplex var. longicorne  W. Krieger
Pediastrum duplex var. reticulatum Lagerheim, 1882
Pediastrum duplex var. rugulosum  Raciborski
Pediastrum duplex var. subgranulatum  Raciborski

References

Further reading
John, D.M. & Tsarenko, P.M. (2002). Order Chlorococcales. In: The Freshwater Algal Flora of the British Isles. An identification guide to freshwater and terrestrial algae. (John, D.M., Whitton, B.A. & Brook, A.J. Eds), pp. 327–409. Cambridge: Cambridge University Press.
Cao, X., Strojsová, A., Znachor, P. & Zapomelová, E. (2005). Detection of extracellular phosphatases in natural spring phytoplankton of a shallow eutrophic lake (Donghu, China). European Journal of Phycology 40: 251–258.
Day, S.A., Wickham, R.P., Entwisle, T.J. & Tyler, P.A. (1995). Bibliographic check-list of non-marine algae in Australia. Flora of Australia Supplementary Series 4: vii + 276.
Hu, H. & Wei, Y. (2006). The freshwater algae of China. Systematics, taxonomy and ecology. pp. [4 pls of 16 figs], [i-iv], i-xv, 1–1023. China: www.sciencep.com.

 pdf
Smoliner, C. (1983). Das zähe leben der grünalge Pediastrum duplex. Mikrokosmos 8: 241–245.

External links
 Images of various infraspecies

Plants described in 1829
Sphaeropleales